The 2010–11 1. FSV Mainz 05 season began on 15 August 2010 with a DFB-Pokal match against Berlin AK 07, and ended on 14 May 2011, the last matchday of the Bundesliga, with a match against FC St Pauli.

Transfers
Source: Mainz 05.de

Summer transfers

In:

Out:

Winter transfers

In:

Out:

Goals and appearances

|}
Last Updated: 11 May 2011 Source: bundesliga.de

Results

Bundesliga

Note: Results are given with 1. FSV Mainz 05 score listed first.

DFB-Pokal

Note: Results are given with 1. FSV Mainz 05 score listed first.

Kits

References

1. FSV Mainz 05 seasons
Mainz